The 2016–17 Cincinnati Bearcats women's basketball team represented the University of Cincinnati during the 2016–17 NCAA Division I women's basketball season. The season marks the third for the Bearcats as members of the American Athletic Conference. The Bearcats, led by eighth year head coach Jamelle Elliott, played their home games at Fifth Third Arena. They finished the season 16–14, 7–9 in AAC play to finish in a 4 way tie for fifth place. They lost in the first round of the American Athletic women's tournament to Houston.

Media
All games will have a video stream on Bearcats TV, ESPN3, or AAC Digital Network

Roster

Schedule and results

|-
!colspan=12 style=""| Exhibition

|-
!colspan=12 style=""| Non-conference regular season

|-
!colspan=12 style=""| AAC regular season

|-
!colspan=12 style="background:#000000;"| American Athletic Conference Women's Tournament

See also
 2016–17 Cincinnati Bearcats men's basketball team

References

External links
Official website 

Cincinnati
Cincinnati Bearcats women's basketball seasons